Al-Mirr, also named Mahmudiyeh ("the property of Mahmud"), was a Palestinian Arab village in the Jaffa Subdistrict, which was depopulated during the 1947–1948 Civil War in Mandatory Palestine on February 1, 1948.

Location
A short, secondary track linked it to the  railway line running between Ras al-Ayn and Petah Tikva.

History
A mill and dam built at this site in late Roman/early Byzantine period were repaired in Crusader times. The mill was mentioned in Crusader sources in 1158/9  C.E.

Excavations of the mill have recovered several 14th-century coins, which indicate that it was in use in the Mamluk period.

Ottoman era
The modern village was founded during the reign of the Mahmud II (1808–39), the Sultan of the Ottoman Empire, and was also known as "Al Mahmudiyya". In 1856 the village was named el Mir on Kiepert's map of Palestine published that year.

In 1870 Victor Guérin visited  and described the village (which he called Ma'moudieh): "It contains at most two hundred inhabitants, who live in houses built of adobe. Several mills are set in motion by the cascading waterfalls along the Nahr el-A'oudjeh. A small bridge over the river makes it possible to cross it at this point". An Ottoman village list from about the same year indicated 30 houses and a population of 69, though the population count included men only.

The PEF's Survey of Western Palestine in 1882 described al-Mirr  as "a small mud village, with mills close to the river."

British Mandate era
During the British Mandate for Palestine, the population was recorded as 75 Muslims in the 1922 census, and the village was classified as a hamlet in the Palestine Index Gazetteer.  In the  1931 census Mahmudiya had 101 inhabitants, still all Muslims, in 25 houses.

In  the 1945 statistics the population numbered 170 Muslims, who worked in agriculture and with transportation. Cultivated lands in the village in 1944-45 included 2 dunums planted with citrus and bananas, and 31 dunums planted with cereals.  2 dunams were classified as built-up areas.

1948, and aftermath
Before the outbreak of the 1948 Arab-Israeli war, al-Mirr's inhabitants left on February 3, 1948, out of fear of Jewish attack. According to Benny Morris, some of the inhabitants returned on February 15, but fled for the final time one month later. However, according to Walid Khalidi, citing The New York Times, the villagers apparently returned yet again, as Jewish forces attacked the village in mid-May. The 13 May attack would have occurred around the same time as an attack into the area by Irgun.

The remains of a Turkish bridge lies where the village was.

Andrew Petersen, an archaeologist specializing in Islamic architecture, visited the mill in 1991. He found that it had probably been built in several phases. Presently, it consists of a rectangular building, 60 m. NS x 10 m EW, on two levels. At the lower level are at least 13 parallel water inlets. These inlets are of two different types, (indicating different construction date); a flat slab roof, and pointed vaulted roof. Between the two levels are holes in the floor,  presumably this is where the millstones were connected to the turbines.

See also

References

Bibliography

 (pp. 192−196: "Les Trois−Ponts, Jorgilia")
 
  
 
 
 
 

  
  
  
Shkolnik, Y. (1994); Urban River, EGMI, 34, March–April, pp. 16–34, 71. Cited in Petersen, 2001.

External links
Welcome To al-Mirr
al-Mirr (Mahmudiya),  Zochrot
Survey of Western Palestine, Map 13: IAA,  Wikimedia commons
Al-Mirr, from the Khalil Sakakini Cultural Center

Arab villages depopulated prior to the 1948 Arab–Israeli War
District of Jaffa